Southcentral Alaska is the portion of the U.S. state of Alaska consisting of the shorelines and uplands of the central Gulf of Alaska.  Most of the population of the state lives in this region, concentrated in and around the city of Anchorage.

The area includes Cook Inlet, the Matanuska-Susitna Valley, the Kenai Peninsula, Prince William Sound, and the Copper River Valley.  Tourism, fisheries, and petroleum production are important economic activities.

Cities
The major city is Anchorage.  Other major towns include Palmer, Wasilla, Kenai, Soldotna, Homer, Seward, Valdez, and Cordova.

Climate
The climate of Southcentral Alaska is subarctic. The hours of daylight per day varies from 20 hours in June and July to 6 hours in December and January. The coastal areas consist of temperate rainforests and alder shrublands. The interior areas are covered by boreal forests.

Mountains
The terrain of Southcentral Alaska is shaped by seven mountain ranges:
Alaska Range
Talkeetna Mountains
Wrangell Mountains
Chugach Mountains
Kenai Mountains
Tordrillo Mountains
Aleutian Range

Southcentral Alaska contains several dormant and active volcanoes. The Wrangell Volcanoes are older, lie in the East, and include Mount Blackburn, Mount Bona, Mount Churchill, Mount Drum, Mount Gordon, Mount Jarvis, Mount Sanford, and Mount Wrangell. The Cook Inlet volcanoes, located in the Tordrillo Mountains and in the north end of the Aleutian Range, are newer, lie in the West, and include Mount Redoubt, Mount Iliamna, Hayes Volcano, Mount Augustine, Fourpeaked Mountain and Mount Spurr. Most recently, Augustine and Fourpeaked erupted in 2006, and Mount Redoubt erupted in March 2009, resulting in airplane flight cancellations.

See also

Anchorage Metropolitan Area
Chugach Census Area, Alaska
Copper River Census Area, Alaska
Matanuska-Susitna Valley
Kenai Peninsula Borough, Alaska

References

 

Regions of Alaska
Tourism regions of Alaska